Kristina Lelas, married Benković, (born 15 April 1974 in Zagreb, SFR Yugoslavia) is a former Croatian female basketball player.

External links
Profile at eurobasket.com

1974 births
Living people
Basketball players from Zagreb
Croatian women's basketball players
Centers (basketball)
Galatasaray S.K. (women's basketball) players